Howl at the Moon is an American piano bar franchise. Howl at the Moon or Howling at the Moon may also refer to:

 Howling

Music
 Howl at the Moon, 2010 album by Danish rock band The Floor Is Made of Lava
 Howl at the Moon, 2010 album by Canadian country music singer Jamie Warren
 "Howl at the Moon", 2014 single by Stadiumx featuring Taylr Renee
 "Howl at the Moon", 2014 iTunes-only song from The Script album No Sound Without Silence
 "Howl at the Moon", song from the 2020 Indigo Girls album Look Long
 "Howlin' at the Moon", 1951 single by Hank Williams
 "Howling at the Moon (Sha-La-La)", song from the 1984 Ramones album, Too Tough to Die
 "Howling at the Moon", song from the 2016 Milow album, Modern Heart
 "Howling at the Moon", song performed by Donna Burke on the 2011 charity compilation album Shine On! Songs Volume One
 How to Howl at the Moon, a 2015 novel by Eli Easton, the first in the Howl at the Moon series

See also
 "I Howl at the Moon", 1993 Urusei Yatsura OVA release
 Bark at the Moon, 1983 album by Ozzy Osbourne
 Howlin' at the Halloween Moon, 1989 live album by The Del-Lords
 Wolf communication, noting that contrary to popular belief, wolves do not howl at the Moon
 Howling